Tetramethylammonium-corrinoid protein Co-methyltransferase (mtqB (gene), tetramethylammonium methyltransferase) is an enzyme with systematic name tetramethylammonium:5-hydroxybenzimidazolylcobamide Co-methyltransferase. This enzyme catalyses the following chemical reaction

 tetramethylammonium + [Co(I) tetramethylammonium-specific corrinoid protein]  [methyl-Co(III) tetramethylammonium-specific corrinoid protein] + trimethylamine

This enzyme is involved in methanogenesis from tetramethylammonium.

References

External links 
 

EC 2.1.1